USCGC Decisive (WMEC-629) is a United States Coast Guard medium endurance cutter.

External links
Decisive  home page

Historic American Engineering Record in Mississippi
Reliance-class cutters
Ships built by the United States Coast Guard Yard
Ships of the United States Coast Guard
1968 ships